Sōji, Soji, Souji or Sohji (written: 総司, 惣司 or 荘司) is a masculine Japanese given name. Notable people with the name include:

People
Soji Kashiwagi (born 1962), American journalist and playwright
, Japanese writer
, Japanese swordsman and Shinsengumi captain
, Japanese anime director and screenwriter

Fictional characters
, fictional character from Kamen Rider Kabuto
Souji "Soushi" Yukimi, fictional character from Soar High! Isami
Souji Seta, fictional character from Megami Tensei
 Soji Asha, from Star Trek: Picard

Japanese masculine given names